Lake Hobart, also known as Rocky Lake, is a reservoir in Washita County, Oklahoma, just to the northwest of Rocky, off U.S. Route 183 and the N2200 and N2190 roads. The reservoir was created as part of the Washita Basin Project in the 1950s, to improve water supply in the area by constructing a dam across Little Elk Creek. The Clinton-Cordell-Hobart Aqueduct carries water from the reservoir to the three communities for which it is named. It is popular with fisherman and boaters. The Grissom Cemetery lies near the northern side of the lake.

The maximum discharge is 53600 cubic feet per second.

Notes

References

Hobart
Bodies of water of Washita County, Oklahoma
Geography of Washita County, Oklahoma